The Burt Henry Covered Bridge, also known as the Henry Covered Bridge or just the Henry Bridge, is a covered bridge that spans the Walloomsac River near Bennington, Vermont.  A Town lattice truss bridge, it carries River Road, just south of the village of North Bennington.  Originally built about 1840, it was listed on the National Register of Historic Places in 1973 as Bennington County's oldest covered bridge.  It was rebuilt in 1989 by the Vermont Agency of Transportation.

Description and history
The Henry Covered Bridge is located on northwestern Bennington, southwest of the village of North Bennington and the campus of Bennington College. The historic Henry House stands just south of the bridge. The sides are finished in novelty siding, while the ends are finished horizontal flushboarding, with vertical boarding sheltering the trusses just inside the portal. The siding on the sides does not always extend to the gabled roof, providing light into the structure.

The bridge's original construction date was estimated to be sometime in the 1830s.  At one time, an attempt to strengthen the bridge was made by doubling the trusses, so that heavily laden trucks could pass over the bridge; this was deemed ineffective, and the change was eventually reversed.  The bridge was completely rebuilt in 1989.

See also
List of Vermont covered bridges
National Register of Historic Places listings in Bennington County, Vermont
List of bridges on the National Register of Historic Places in Vermont

References

Henry Covered Bridge
Henry Covered Bridge
Henry Covered Bridge
Wooden bridges in Vermont
Bridges in Bennington County, Vermont
Tourist attractions in Bennington County, Vermont
National Register of Historic Places in Bennington County, Vermont
Road bridges on the National Register of Historic Places in Vermont
Lattice truss bridges in the United States
1840 establishments in Vermont